Jacob Dixon Doyle (November 26, 1855 – August 15, 1941) was an American Major League Baseball shortstop who played for the  Washington Nationals of the National Association, the first professional league. He was born in Leesburg, Virginia.

In his nine-game career, Doyle hit .268, with six runs, one double, and nine RBIs. At 16 years of age, he was the youngest player in the National Association during the 1872 season.

Doyle died in Lake Bluff, Illinois at the age of 85, and is interred at North Shore Garden of Memories in Chicago, Illinois.

References

External links

Washington Nationals (NA) players
19th-century baseball players
Major League Baseball shortstops
Baseball players from Virginia
1855 births
1941 deaths
People from Leesburg, Virginia
People from Lake Bluff, Illinois